Dongping National Forest Park is a forest park located on the north side of Chongming Island in Chongming District, Shanghai, China.

History
Dongping National Forest Park grew out of Dongping Forest Farm which was enclosed and founded in 1959. Since it was formally opened to the public in June 1989, it has attracted thousands of tourists every year. Top Chinese central leaders such as Jiang Zemin, Zhu Rongji, Yao Yilin and Chen Muhua have visited the park. Because of continual improvements to its scale and facilities, it was named Dongping National Forest Park by the Ministry of Chinese Forest Industry in June 1993 and evaluated as one of the ten new resorts in Shanghai at the beginning of 1997.

References 

Parks in Shanghai